Tongshan is a county of Xianning City, in the southeastern part of Hubei province, People's Republic of China, bordering Jiangxi to the south. 

The county is located along Hubei's mountainous south-eastern border with Jiangxi. Its best known tourist attraction is the Jiugong Mountain National Park, located in the Jiugong Range, south of Jiugongshan Town.

The county is roughly coterminous with the upper part of the basin of the Fushui River, which flows eastward, into the neighboring Yangxin County, where it discharges into the Yangtze. A fairly large Fushui Reservoir (Fushui Shuiku) is formed on this river and its tributaries within Tongshan County by a dam that's actually built in Yangxin County, a bit downstream of the county line. There are also a few smaller reservoirs on the Fushui's tributaries.

The county seat is in the town of Tongyang; as it is customary in China, this location is usually labeled on less-detailed maps simply as "Tongshan County" or "Tongshan".

The county is served by China National Highway 106 (G106), which joins with G316 near the eastern tip of the county.

Xianning Nuclear Power Plant is under construction near Tongshan County's Dafan Town.

Administrative divisions
The county is divided into 8 towns, 4 townships and 1 other area:
Towns: Tongyang (the county seat), Nanlinqiao, Huangshapu, Xiapu, Chuangwang, Honggang, Dafan, Jiugong Shan.
Townships: Dalu, Yangfanglin, Cikou, Yanxia (Yansha?).
Other area: Jiugongshan Tourism District Management Committee

Climate

References

Counties of Hubei
Xianning